The Redway School is an all-age (2–19) state special school for children and young people who experience severe learning difficulties, serving the children of the Borough of Milton Keynes in Buckinghamshire, England. It is situated in the Netherfield district of southern Milton Keynes.

Ruth Sylvester is the school's second headteacher.  She took up her post in September 2005.

History 
The school opened on 26 April 1993, upon the closure of Oliver Wells (Physical Difficulties) and Queens (Severe Learning Difficulties) Schools. Until September 1993, the school had two sites, in Netherfield and at the Queens campus on Whalley Drive, Bletchley. From September 1993 and until about February/March 1997 the school occupied the Whalley Drive site whilst the Netherfield site was extended and refurbished.

The reason that the extension and refurbishment took so long was that the first scheme was not allowed to go ahead. It was called off in January 1994 by the Department for Education (DfE).  This was because the local education authority, it was then Buckinghamshire County Council, had not complied with all the DfE requests and had not listened to the parents.

From 1 April 1997 the school became the responsibility of Milton Keynes Council.

In February 2003 OFSTED's annual report named The Redway as a "particularly successful school".

Facilities 
The school's specialist facilities include a dark room, a light stimulation room, soft play room, music room, design and technology/art room, secondary and primary food technology rooms, a hall, a conservatory, a flat within the Post-16 department for the teaching of independent life skills, a gym and a hydrotherapy pool. It also has a family room, a large meeting room, a library with a Connexions Point, and a suite of therapy rooms used by the medical professionals who work alongside school staff.

References

Further reading

External links

Special schools in Milton Keynes
Educational institutions established in 1993
1993 establishments in England
Community schools in Milton Keynes